Elizabeth Ann Cole, known professionally as Elizabeth Ashley (born August 30, 1939) is an American actress of theatre, film, and television. She has been nominated for three Tony Awards, winning once in 1962 for Take Her, She's Mine. Ashley was also nominated for the BAFTA and Golden Globe awards for her supporting performance in The Carpetbaggers (1964), and was nominated for an Emmy Award in 1991 for Evening Shade. Elizabeth was a guest on The Tonight Show with Johnny Carson 24 times.  She appeared in several episodes of In the Heat of the Night as Maybelle Chesboro. She also appeared in an episode of Mannix, The Dark Hours 1974.

Early life
Ashley was born to a music teacher and raised in Baton Rouge, Louisiana.

Ashley left Louisiana State University after her freshman year and moved to New York. She studied acting at the Neighborhood Playhouse School of the Theatre there, supporting herself by working as the Jell-O pudding girl on a television program and as a showroom model.

Career
Ashley won a Tony Award for Best Featured Actress in a Play for Take Her, She's Mine, then later starred as Corie in the original Broadway production of Neil Simon's Barefoot in the Park (1963) and, later, as Maggie in a Broadway revival of Tennessee Williams' Cat on a Hot Tin Roof (1974). She received Tony nominations for both performances. She appeared on Broadway as Dr. Livingstone in Agnes of God (1982) and was a replacement in the role of Mattie Fae during the original Broadway run of August: Osage County.

She has been featured in major motion pictures over five decades, including early roles in The Carpetbaggers (1964), Ship of Fools (1965), and The Third Day (1965). Her other film credits include The Marriage of a Young Stockbroker (1971), Rancho Deluxe (1975), Coma (1978), Paternity (1981), Dragnet (1987), and Vampire's Kiss (1989), and she starred as the villain in the controversial film Windows (1980).

She first appeared with Burt Reynolds in a 1969 season episode of Love, American Style, then later in the movie Paternity in 1981, as a guest star in his television series B.L. Stryker in 1989,  and finally as a cast member in his final television series, Evening Shade, from 1990 to 1994 as Aunt Frieda Evans.

Ashley had the role of Kate in Sandburg's Lincoln, a six-part dramatization that ran on NBC in the mid-1970s. Her other television appearances include the 1987 miniseries The Two Mrs. Grenvilles, and guest roles in Ben Casey; Route 66; Sam Benedict; Stoney Burke; The Six Million Dollar Man; Family; Miami Vice; Caroline in the City; Mission: Impossible; Murder, She Wrote; Dave's World; Law & Order; Law & Order: Special Victims Unit; Touched by an Angel; The Larry Sanders Show; Homicide: Life on the Street; Russian Doll; and Better Things. She was featured in 14 episodes of the HBO series Treme as Aunt Mimi.

Book 
Ashley's autobiography Actress: Postcards from the Road was published in a hardcover edition on June 1, 1978 by M. Evans & Co (now part of the Rowman & Littlefield Publishing Group). A paperback publication followed on October 12, 1979 through Fawcett Publications.

Personal life
Ashley is thrice married and divorced. Her first and second husbands were actors James Farentino and George Peppard. The latter was her leading man in her first movie, The Carpetbaggers (1964). The couple had a son, Christian. Her divorce from Peppard caused the cancellation of his television series Banacek; he quit the show to prevent her from receiving a larger percentage of his earnings as part of their divorce settlement.

At 25, Ashley retired from acting "to make a home for my husband, see that he had his dinner on time, realize myself as a woman." She resumed her career four years later.

Filmography

Film

Television

References

External links

 
 
 
 
 
 InnerVIEWS with Ernie Manouse: Elizabeth Ashley  (TV Interview)

20th-century American actresses
Actresses from Baton Rouge, Louisiana
Actresses from Los Angeles
Actresses from Florida
American film actresses
American stage actresses
American television actresses
Living people
Louisiana State University Laboratory School alumni
Actresses from New York City
People from Ocala, Florida
Tony Award winners
American autobiographers
Women autobiographers
21st-century American women
1939 births